Quentin Quail is a 1946 Warner Bros. Merrie Melodies cartoon directed by Chuck Jones. The short was released on March 2, 1946.

Plot
The film presents a tale about a quail (voiced by Tedd Pierce) who goes through various trials and tribulations to try to get a worm for his baby, Toots (a take-off, voiced by Sara Berner, on Fanny Brice's radio character Baby Snooks), only to have her refuse to eat the worm because it looks like Frank Sinatra.

Production
Prior to the release of this short, the name "Quentin Quail" first appeared on a model sheet by Bob Clampett, done at some point before 1942. The character is a precursor to Clampett's more famous creation, Tweety, and bears a striking resemblance to the canary.  Mel Blanc provides Quentin Quail's screams and sneezes, as well as the Crow's voice.

References

External links

1946 films
1946 animated films
1946 short films
Merrie Melodies short films
Warner Bros. Cartoons animated short films
Animated films about birds
Short films directed by Chuck Jones
Films scored by Carl Stalling
1940s Warner Bros. animated short films
Cultural depictions of Frank Sinatra
Films about worms